Steward is an English occupational surname.

Notable people surnamed Steward include the following:

 Alan Steward, record producer, song writer and recording artist 
 Alf Steward (1896–after 1939), English football player and manager
 Andrew Steward (born 1954), Australian water polo player 
 Anthony Steward (born 1978), American basketball player 
 Augustine Steward (1491–1571), English politician
 Austin Steward (1793–1860), American slave, abolitionist and author
 Brad Steward, American snowboarder and entrepreneur
 David Steward (born 1951), American business executive 
 Dean Steward (1923–1979), American football player
 Derek Steward (fl. 1950), New Zealand runner
 Eddie Mae Steward (1938–2000), American civil rights activist
 Emanuel Steward (1944-2012), American boxing trainer and commentator 
 Ernest Steward (1910–1990), British cinematographer
 Frederick Campion Steward (1904–1993), British botanist and plant physiologist
 Gabriel Steward
 Gabriel Tucker Steward
 Gregory Steward (born 1962), American canoer 
 Harold Macdonald Steward (1904–1977), British engineer and politician
 Herbie Steward (1926–2003), American saxophonist
 Jimmy Steward (born 1946), Honduran football player
 John Steward (1874–1937), Anglican bishop of Melanesia
 Joseph Steward (1753–1822), American artist
 Julian Steward (1902–1972), American anthropologist
 Katrina Elayne Steward (born 1979), American choreographer, dancer, singer and actress
 Lewis Steward (1824–1896), American politician
 Natalie Steward (born 1943), British swimmer
 Nicholas Steward (MP for Cambridge University) (before 1547–1634), English politician 
 Osbern the Steward (before 1007–c. 1040), Norman steward
 Pat Steward (born 1962), Canadian musician
 Peter Steward (born 1942), Australian Australian rules footballer 
 Richard Steward (c. 1593–1651), English churchman
 Richard Augustus Tucker Steward
 Robert Steward (disambiguation) (before 1503–1557), English cleric
 Ron Steward (born 1927), Australian media personality
 Samuel Steward (1909–1993), American writer, professor, tattoo artist and pornographer
 Simon Steward (c. 1572–after 1629), English politician
 Susan McKinney Steward (1847–1918), American physician and author
 Theophilus Gould Steward (1843–1924), American author, educator and clergyman
 Tim Steward, Australian musician, singer and songwriter
 Tony Steward (1941–2002), South African cricketer
 Tony Steward (American football) (born 1992), American football player 
 William Steward (New Zealand politician) (1841–1912), New Zealand politician 
 William Steward (UK politician) (1901–1987), British politician

See also
 Stewart (surname)

Surnames
Occupational surnames
English-language occupational surnames